Rock for the King is a 1986 heavy metal album released by the Christian metal band Barren Cross.

Track listing 
 "Dying Day" - 3:27
 "He Loves You" - 4:37
 "It's All Come True" - 4:05
 "Believe" - 2:16
 "Going Nowhere" - 3:49
 "Rock For The King" - 5:02
 "Give Your Life" - 2:49
 "Just A Touch" - 3:29
 "Light The Flame" - 5:34

Credits

Band
Mike Lee - lead vocals and acoustic guitar
Ray Parris - rhythm and lead guitar, acoustic guitars, background vocals
Steve Whitaker - drums, background vocals
Jim LaVerde - bass  guitar, taurus synthesizer pedals, background vocals

References

1986 debut albums
Barren Cross albums